You Be My Heart is a benefit album for 826 Valencia.

Track listing

External links
 Official site

References

2013 albums